A. Nagathihalli  is a village in the southern state of Karnataka, India. It is located in the Nagamangala taluk of Mandya district in Karnataka.

See also
 Mandya
 Districts of Karnataka

References

External links
 Mandya website

Villages in Mandya district